In complex analysis, the Riemann mapping theorem states that if  is a non-empty simply connected open subset of the complex number plane  which is not all of , then there exists a biholomorphic mapping  (i.e. a bijective holomorphic mapping whose inverse is also holomorphic) from  onto the open unit disk 

This mapping is known as a Riemann mapping.

Intuitively, the condition that  be simply connected means that  does not contain any “holes”. The fact that  is biholomorphic implies that it is a conformal map and therefore angle-preserving. Such a map may be interpreted as preserving the shape of any sufficiently small figure, while possibly rotating and scaling (but not reflecting) it.

This is an easy consequence of the Schwarz lemma.

As a corollary of the theorem, any two simply connected open subsets of the Riemann sphere which both lack at least two points of the sphere can be conformally mapped into each other.

History
Lars Ahlfors wrote once, concerning the original formulation of the theorem, that it was “ultimately formulated in terms which would defy any attempt of proof, even with modern methods”. Riemann's flawed proof depended on the Dirichlet principle (which was named by Riemann himself), which was considered sound at the time. However, Karl Weierstrass found that this principle was not universally valid. Later, David Hilbert was able to prove that, to a large extent, the Dirichlet principle is valid under the hypothesis that Riemann was working with.

The first rigorous proof of the theorem was given by William Fogg Osgood in 1900. He proved the existence of Green's function on arbitrary simply connected domains other than  itself; this established the Riemann mapping theorem.

Constantin Carathéodory gave another proof of the theorem in 1912, which was the first to rely purely on the methods of function theory rather than potential theory. His proof used Montel's concept of normal families, which became the standard method of proof in textbooks. Carathéodory continued in 1913 by resolving the additional question of whether the Riemann mapping between the domains can be extended to a homeomorphism of the boundaries (see Carathéodory's theorem).

Carathéodory's proof used Riemann surfaces and it was simplified by Paul Koebe two years later in a way that did not require them. Another proof, due to Lipót Fejér and to Frigyes Riesz, was published in 1922 and it was rather shorter than the previous ones. In this proof, like in Riemann's proof, the desired mapping was obtained as the solution of an extremal problem. The Fejér–Riesz proof was further simplified by Alexander Ostrowski and by Carathéodory.

Importance
The following points detail the uniqueness and power of the Riemann mapping theorem:

 Even relatively simple Riemann mappings (for example a map from the interior of a circle to the interior of a square) have no explicit formula using only elementary functions.
 Simply connected open sets in the plane can be highly complicated, for instance, the boundary can be a nowhere-differentiable fractal curve of infinite length, even if the set itself is bounded. One such example is the Koch curve. The fact that such a set can be mapped in an angle-preserving manner to the nice and regular unit disc seems counter-intuitive.
 The analog of the Riemann mapping theorem for more complicated domains is not true. The next simplest case is of doubly connected domains (domains with a single hole).
 The analogue of the Riemann mapping theorem in three or more real dimensions is not true. The family of conformal maps in three dimensions is very poor, and essentially contains only Möbius transformations (see  Liouville's theorem).
 Even if arbitrary homeomorphisms in higher dimensions are permitted, contractible manifolds can be found that are not homeomorphic to the  ball (e.g., the Whitehead continuum).
 The analogue of the Riemann mapping theorem in several complex variables is also not true. In , the ball and polydisk are both simply connected, but there is no biholomorphic map between them.

Proof via normal families

Simple connectivity 

Theorem. For an open domain  the following conditions are equivalent:

  is simply connected;
 the integral of every holomorphic function  around a closed piecewise smooth curve in  vanishes;
 every nowhere-vanishing holomorphic function  on  has a holomorphic logarithm;
 every nowhere-vanishing holomorphic function  on  has a holomorphic square root;

(1) ⇒ (2) because any continuous closed curve, with base point , can be continuously deformed to the constant curve .

(4) ⇒ (5) by taking the square root as  where  is a holomorphic choice of logarithm.

Then  and  does not meet  or : it consists of finitely many horizontal and vertical segments in  forming a finite number of closed rectangular paths . Taking  to be all the squares covering , then  equals the sum of the winding numbers of  
On the other hand the sum of the winding numbers of  about  equals .

(7) ⇒ (1) This is a purely topological argument. The reasoning follows a "northeast argument": in the non self-intersecting path there will be a corner  with largest real part (easterly) and then amongst those one with largest imaginary part (northerly). Let  be the open rectangle with these vertices. Hence . But in this case the path can be deformed by replacing the three sides of the rectangle by the fourth, resulting in two less sides (with self-intersections permitted).

Riemann mapping theorem 

Weierstrass' convergence theorem. The uniform limit on compacta of a sequence of holomorphic functions is holomorphic; similarly for derivatives.
This is an immediate consequence of Morera's theorem for the first statement. Cauchy's integral formula gives a formula for the derivatives which can be used to check that the derivatives also converge uniformly on compacta.

Hurwitz's theorem. If a sequence of nowhere-vanishing holomorphic functions on an open domain has a uniform limit on compacta, then either the limit is identically zero or the limit is nowhere-vanishing. If a sequence of univalent holomorphic functions on an open domain has a uniform limit on compacta, then either the limit is constant or the limit is univalent.
If the limit function is non-zero, then its zeros have to be isolated. Zeros with multiplicities can be counted by the winding number  for a holomorphic function . Hence winding numbers are continuous under uniform limits, so that if each function in the sequence has no zeros nor can the limit. For the second statement suppose that  and set .

Definitions. A family  of holomorphic functions on an open domain is said to be normal if any sequence of functions in  has a subsequence that converges to a holomorphic function uniformly on compacta. 
A family  is said to be locally bounded if their functions are uniformly bounded on each compact disk. Differentiating the  Cauchy integral formula, it follows that the derivatives of a locally bounded family are also locally bounded.

Montel's theorem. Every locally bounded family of holomorphic functions in a domain  is normal.  
By locally boundedness and a "diagonal argument", a subsequence can be chosen so that  is convergent at each point . It must be verified that this sequence of holomorphic functions converges on  uniformly on each compactum . Since 
,
we have that .

Riemann mapping theorem.
But by the Schwarz lemma, the univalent holomorphic maps of the unit disk onto itself are given by the Möbius transformations

It is a normal family by Montel's theorem. By Montel's theorem, passing to a subsequence if necessary,  tends to a holomorphic function  uniformly on compacta. By Hurwitz's theorem,  is either univalent or constant. It remains to check that the conformal mapping  takes  onto . The function  is univalent and maps  into . Let

where . Then  and a routine computation shows that

Remark. As a consequence of the Riemann mapping theorem, every simply connected domain in the plane is homeomorphic to the unit disk. If points are omitted, this follows from the theorem. For the whole plane, the homeomorphism  gives a homeomorphism of  onto .

Parallel slit mappings 
Koebe's uniformization theorem for normal families also generalizes to yield uniformizers  for multiply-connected domains to finite parallel slit domains, where the slits have angle  to the -axis.

near , maximizing  and having image  a parallel slit domain with angle  to the -axis.

The first proof that parallel slit domains were canonical domains for in the multiply connected case was given by David Hilbert in 1909. , on his book on univalent functions and conformal mappings, gave a treatment based on the work of Herbert Grötzsch and René de Possel from the early 1930s; it was the precursor of quasiconformal mappings and quadratic differentials, later developed as the technique of extremal metric due to Oswald Teichmüller. Menahem Schiffer gave a treatment based on very general variational principles, summarised in addresses he gave to the International Congress of Mathematicians in 1950 and 1958. In a theorem on "boundary variation" (to distinguish it from "interior variation"), he derived a differential equation and inequality, that relied on a measure-theoretic characterisation of straight-line segments due to Ughtred Shuttleworth Haslam-Jones from 1936. Haslam-Jones' proof was regarded as difficult and was only given a satisfactory proof in the mid-1970s by Schober and Campbell–Lamoureux.

 gave a proof of uniformization for parallel slit domains which was similar to the Riemann mapping theorem.  To simplify notation, horizontal slits will be taken. Firstly, by Bieberbach's inequality, any univalent function

As a consequence, if

To see this, take  and set

To prove now that the multiply connected domain  can be uniformized by a horizontal parallel slit conformal mapping
,
take  large enough that  lies in the open disk . This applies in particular to the coefficient: so by compactness there is a univalent  which maximizes . To check that

is the required parallel slit transformation, suppose reductio ad absurdum that  has a compact and connected component  of its boundary which is not a horizontal slit. By the Riemann mapping theorem there is a conformal mapping

So we have that

Therefore, . On the other hand by the Riemann mapping theorem there is a conformal mapping

mapping from  onto . Then

By the strict maximality for the slit mapping in the previous paragraph, we can see that , so that .

Applying the inverse of the Joukowsky transform  to the horizontal slit domain, it can be assumed that  is a domain bounded by the unit circle  and contains analytic arcs  and isolated points (the images of other the inverse of the Joukowsky transform under the other parallel horizontal slits). Thus, taking a fixed , there is a univalent mapping

with its image a horizontal slit domain. Suppose that  is another uniformizer with

If it is constant, then it must be identically zero since . Suppose  is non-constant, then by assumption  are all horizontal lines. This contradicts the fact that the non-constant holomorphic function  is an open mapping.

Sketch proof via Dirichlet problem 
For this sketch, we will assume that U is bounded and its boundary is smooth, much like Riemann did. Write

where  is some (to be determined) holomorphic function with real part  and imaginary part .

on the boundary. Since  is the real part of a holomorphic function, we know that  is necessarily a harmonic function; i.e., it satisfies Laplace's equation.

The positive answer is provided by the Dirichlet principle. Once the existence of  has been established, the Cauchy–Riemann equations for the holomorphic function  allow us to find  (this argument depends on the assumption that  be simply connected). Once  and  have been constructed, one has to check that the resulting function  does indeed have all the required properties.

Uniformization theorem
The Riemann mapping theorem can be generalized to the context of Riemann surfaces: If  is a non-empty simply-connected open subset of a Riemann surface, then  is biholomorphic to one of the following: the Riemann sphere, the complex plane , or the unit disk . This is known as the uniformization theorem.

Smooth Riemann mapping theorem
In the case of a simply connected bounded domain with smooth boundary, the Riemann mapping function and all its derivatives extend by continuity to the closure of the domain. This can be proved using regularity properties of solutions of the Dirichlet boundary value problem, which follow either from the theory of Sobolev spaces for planar domains or from classical potential theory. Other methods for proving the smooth Riemann mapping theorem include the theory of kernel functions or the Beltrami equation.

Algorithms 
Computational conformal mapping is prominently featured in problems of applied analysis and mathematical physics, as well as in engineering disciplines, such as image processing.

In the early 1980s an elementary algorithm for computing conformal maps was discovered. Given points  in the plane, the algorithm computes an explicit conformal map of the unit disk onto a region bounded by a Jordan curve  with  This algorithm converges for Jordan regions in the sense of uniformly close boundaries. There are corresponding uniform estimates on the closed region and the closed disc for the mapping functions and their inverses. Improved estimates are obtained if the data points lie on a  curve or a -quasicircle. The algorithm was discovered as an approximate method for conformal welding; however, it can also be viewed as a discretization of the Loewner differential equation.

The following is known about numerically approximating the conformal mapping between two planar domains.

Positive results:

 There is an algorithm A that computes the uniformizing map in the following sense.

 There is an algorithm A′ that computes the uniformizing map in the following sense.

Negative results:

 Suppose there is an algorithm A that given a simply-connected domain  with a linear-time computable boundary and an inner radius  and a number  computes the first  digits of the conformal radius  then we can use one call to A to solve any instance of a #SAT() with a linear time overhead. In other words, #P is poly-time reducible to computing the conformal radius of a set.

See also
Measurable Riemann mapping theorem
Schwarz–Christoffel mapping – a conformal transformation of the upper half-plane onto the interior of a simple polygon.
Conformal radius

Notes

References

External links

Theorems in complex analysis
Bernhard Riemann